Jordan Christopher Silk (born 13 April 1992) is an Australian cricketer who plays for Tasmania. Silk was recruited from Sydney grade cricket where he holds the record for being the youngest player to make a century on debut. 

Silk fielded as a substitute for Australia against Sri Lanka in Hobart on 16 December 2012, and caught Nuwan Kulasekara off the bowling of Nathan Lyon.

Domestic career
Silk made his first class debut against Queensland on 7 March 2013. In his second game, he made a century to help Tasmania into the Sheffield Shield final. In the final, Silk again scored a century, to help Tasmania win its third title.

In April 2013, Silk was selected as part of the Australia A cricket team to tour England.

In 2016, Silk spent a season with Cuckfield Cricket Club and racked up 947 runs for the club in the Sussex Premier League.

Big Bash League
Silk currently plays for the Sydney Sixers franchise from the 2013–14 Big Bash League season. He was awarded the Bradman Young Cricketer of the Year at the Allan Border Medal ceremony by the CA in 2014.

On 22 January 2015, Silk took another spectacular catch for the Sixers, as well scored a match-winning 69 not out against Sydney Thunder on the final home game for Brett Lee. He then took the final catch to win the game against Adelaide Strikers, and helped them qualify for the finals.

Silk is renowned for his sweep shot in the Big Bash League. Also being able to finish off the innings for the Sydney Sixers. But one of his best abilities is his catches. He has taken many special catches in the Big Bash League including Brisbane Heat player Craig Kieswetter and Sydney Thunder player Chris Green.

Career best performances

References

Living people
1992 births
Tasmania cricketers
Australian cricketers
Sydney Sixers cricketers
Cricketers from Sydney